Labeobarbus batesii is a species of cyprinid fish from Africa that occurs in Cameroon, Chad and Gabon.

References 

Cyprinid fish of Africa
batesii
Taxa named by George Albert Boulenger
Fish described in 1903